The Azad University in Oxford (AUO) is a university campus in Oxford, England, branch of the Islamic Azad University, Iran.

AUO was founded in 2004 as part of Islamic Azad University's mission of international cooperation and the creation of a global community of educational and cultural exchange, and is one of the first higher education initiatives in Europe by a large private university in Iran. The parent Islamic Azad University has over one million students and more than 30,000 members of staff. A number of its lecturers have been granted tuition scholarships to strengthen their qualifications by working for the PhD degree in AUO and its partner universities in the UK.

The institution offers undergraduate, postgraduate and research degrees, as well as short courses in English language.

AUO is a part of the world's largest university in terms of students enrolled. AUO Oxford started operations in July 2004 as the first campus of Azad University in Europe. AUO is located in Farmoor, five miles west of the centre of Oxford.

AUO offers merit based scholarships, and academic programmes at undergraduate, Masters, and pre-Masters, Diploma and Advanced Diploma levels and short courses.

See also
 Islamic Azad University

References

External links
 http://www.auo.org.uk
  Science and Research Branch, Islamic Azad University  
  White October
  Hot courses
  UK study
  Floodlight

Universities in England
Educational institutions established in 2004
2004 establishments in England
Oxford
Vale of White Horse